Blue Boy (also styled The Blue Boy) is a pseudonym for the British DJ Alexis 'Lex' Blackmore. He is best known for "Remember Me", which peaked at No. 8 in the UK in 1997. Blackmore first worked as a DJ in Glasgow and London, touring with the British electronic group the Shamen in 1991. After working in various guises, Blackmore established the Blue Boy name in 1995 with the single "Sandman" on Ascension Records, followed by the four-track EP, Scattered Emotions.

A re-release of "Sandman" in August 1997 reached No. 25 on the UK Singles Chart.

Discography

Singles

EPs
Scattered Emotions EP (1996), Guidance Recordings

References

External links

British DJs
British record producers
British house musicians
Living people
Jive Records artists
Year of birth missing (living people)